Wei Zhen (born 12 February 1997) is a Chinese footballer who currently plays for Shanghai SIPG in the Chinese Super League.

Club career
Wei Zhen joined Chinese Super League side Shanghai SIPG's youth academy in November 2014 when Shanghai SIPG bought Shanghai Luckystar' youth team. He was promoted to the first team squad in the middle of 2016 season. Wei made his senior debut on 3 August 2017, playing the whole match in a 4–0 home win against Tianjin Quanjian in the second leg of 2017 Chinese FA Cup fifth round. He made his league debut three days later in a 0–0 home draw against Tianjin Quanjian, also playing full 90 minutes and was selected as player of the match. He made 13 appearances for the club in the 2017 season. Shanghai SIPG refused his transfer request to Tianjin Quanjian in February 2018. Wei applied to the CFA for arbitration in April 2018. He didn't play for Shanghai SIPG in the 2018 season. In January 2019, he made a public apology to the club.

Career statistics
.

Honours

Club
Shanghai SIPG
Chinese FA Super Cup: 2019

References

External links
 

1997 births
Living people
Chinese footballers
People from Lu'an
Footballers from Anhui
Shanghai Port F.C. players
Chinese Super League players
Association football defenders